The Rapist is a 2021 Indian Hindi drama film written and directed by Aparna Sen. A Quest Films Pvt. Ltd. production, produced under the banner of Applause Entertainment, stars Konkona Sen Sharma, Arjun Rampal and Tanmay Dhanania. The film chronicles the journey of three protagonists, whose lives are interlaced because of one horrific incident. It premiered under the 'A Window on Asian Cinema' section at 26th Busan International Film Festival on 7 October 2021, and jointly won the Kim Jiseok award with 2021 Philippine Japanese sports biographical film Gensan Punch.

Cast
 Konkona Sen Sharma as Naina Malik
 Arjun Rampal as Aftab Malik
 Tanmay Dhanania as Prasad Singh 
 Anindita Bose as Malini, colleague of Naina
 Harleen Rekhi
 Gitanjali Rao as rapist's mother
 Vijay Kumar Dogra as police inspector
 Chetan Sharma as Latif, slum gang leader
 Sukesh Arora as Subhash, Aftab’s lawyer friend
 Semma Azmi as Savitri, Naina's maid
 Devika Prasad as Nurse in Nursing Home

Production
Aparna Sen writing script for her 3rd Hindi film The Rapist, said "What drew me to this is the psychology of the three main protagonists. Stripping off the layers and carefully built up facades to get to the real person underneath is quite a challenge and a fascinating process." Pre-production work of the film began in February 2021 with finalization of cast and producers. The filmmaker Aparna Sen in her pre-production interview said, The Rapist will be a “hard-hitting drama that examines how much of society is responsible for producing rapists.” Principal photography began in early March 2021 in Delhi. Arjun Rampal finished his part of shooting in the 3rd week of March. The film was wrapped up in first week of April 2021.

Release
The Rapist had its premiere at 26th Busan International Film Festival under the 'A Window on Asian Cinema' section on 7 October 2021.

The film was also been nominated for 
Kim Jiseok award in Busan International Film Festival.

Reception
Richard Kuipers of Variety praising the direction  of Aparna Sen wrote, "One of the best works directed by veteran filmmaker-actor Aparna Sen". And appreciating screenplay he wrote, "The great strength of Sen’s screenplay is the realistic manner in which it depicts Naina and Aftab’s reactions to events that challenge firmly held beliefs and threaten their marriage." Kuipers opined about the film, “The Rapist is a deeply affecting portrait of personal trauma and an intelligent examination of social and cultural factors fueling the horrifying prevalence of sexual violence in India." Criticizing visuals of the film, he said, "The only real imperfections to the film are visual, with some scenes being drained of most color for no immediately apparent reason."

Award and nomination

References

External links
 

2021 films
2021 drama films
2020s Hindi-language films
Films directed by Aparna Sen
Films shot in Delhi
Films about rape in India